Clergy is a 2018 Polish drama co-written and directed by Wojciech Smarzowski. The film stars Arkadiusz Jakubik, Robert Wieckiewicz and Jacek Braciak as three priests united by an event that almost took their lives.

Plot
Three priests meet on the same date of a past event that could have taken their lives.

Cast
 Arkadiusz Jakubik as Priest Andrzej Kukula
 Robert Wieckiewicz as Priest Tadeusz Trybus
 Jacek Braciak as Priest Leszek Lisowski
 Joanna Kulig as Hanka Tomala
 Janusz Gajos as Archbishop Mordowicz
 Adrian Zaremba as Vicar Jan
 Magdalena Celówna-Janikowska as Natalia
 Antoni Barłowski as Czekaj
 Jacek Beler as Priest Petarda
 Stanisław Brejdygant as Priest Teodor
 Bartosz Bielenia as Toady

Release

Box office
Clergy was wide released in Poland on September 28, 2018 and grossed $29,913,342, breaking several box office records. About 935,000 viewers watched the film in its opening weekend, the best opening for a Polish film in Poland in 30 years.

Reception
Mike McCahill from The Guardian gave the film three out of five stars, stating: "Controversial in its native Poland, this ambitious drama skilfully shows its clerical cast are as much victims as villains". Richard Lewis writing for the "Wroclaw Uncut" gave Clergy a good review saying: "It’s an interesting and topical film made by the leading faces of Polish cinema and will only increase the growing stature of Polish film around the world. It holds no punches and has got people talking about some difficult issues. It is amusing and shocking in equal measure. It is certainly a zeitgeist moment and I recommend you see it". However, Lewis also criticized some aspects of the movie: "The characters are a bit thin and their deeper psychological motivations are largely unexplored. Some of the plot twists and turns become somewhat difficult to follow towards the end and I think perhaps half-an-hour could have been shaved off the running time".

Accolades
Clergy received several awards and nominations.

Controversy
In Poland, Clergy, which explores polemic themes such as child abuse, corruption, and alcoholism in the Catholic Church in Poland, was “highly controversial” upon its release and it was heavily criticized by several right-wing and nationalist groups in the Polish society, including the Polish government that is currently led by the conservative and pro-clerical party, Law and Justice.

Sequel 
A sequel is planned, with a budget of 20 million euros, and an Italian co-production with a possible plot about the Vatican.

References

External links
 
 

Polish drama films
2010s Polish-language films
2010s Czech-language films
2010s Italian-language films
2018 drama films
Films critical of the Catholic Church